Louis Kugelmann, or Ludwig Kugelmann (19 February 1828 in Lemförde – 9 January 1902 in Hannover), was a German gynecologist, social democratic thinker and activist, and confidant of Marx and Engels.

Personal life
Kugelmann married Gertrud Oppenheim (born 27 January 1839 in Bonn; died 1920 in Wiesbaden). They had a daughter Franziska Kugelmann  (9 October 1858 in Hannover – 31 August 1939 in Wiesbaden).

He met with Karl Marx several times, visited him in Hannover, and exchanged letters with him and Friedrich Engels during the period 1862 to 1893. He was a member of the International Workingmen's Association and later the Social Democratic Party of Germany (SPD).

Works 
 Ignaz Philipp Semmelweis: Offener Brief an sämmtliche Professoren der Geburtshilfe. Universitäts-Buchdruckerei, Ofen 1862, p. III-VI (Kugelmann to Semmelweis 18. Juli 1861 and 10. August 1861.)
 Rudolf Virchow: Mittheilung einer von Dr. Kugelmann eingereichten Krankengeschichte. In: Monatsschrift für Geburtskunde und Frauenkrankheiten. August Hirschfeld, Berlin 1861, p. 328-334
 Gynäkologische Mittheilungen, besonders über die chronische oophoritis und über Neurosen, erzeugt durch Krankheiten der weiblichen Sexualorgane. In: Deutsche Klinik. Zeitung für Beobachtungen aus deutschen Kliniken und Krankenhäusern. Berlin 1865, Nr.14-18
 Die Behandlung der acuten Exantheme durch continuirliche Ventilation. In: Deutsche Klinik. Zeitung für Beobachtungen aus deutschen Kliniken und Krankenhäusern. Berlin Nr. 17 vom 24. April 1869, p. 156-157
 Die Behandlung der acuten Exantheme (Masern, Scharlach, Blattern) durch continuirliche Ventilation. Schmorl & von Seefeld, Hannover 1873
 Wie ist die Sterblichkeit bei Scharlach, Masern und im Wochenbette auf ein Minimum zu reduciren. Vortrag gehalten im Verein für Öffentliche Gesundheitspflege in Hannover am 25. Mai und 12. October 1875. Schmorl & von Seefeld, Hannover 1876

Notes

References
 Antiquariatskatalog, enthaltend die Bibliothek des weiland Dr. Louis Kugelmann. Hannover 1902
 Briefe von Karl Marx an Dr. L. Kugelmann. Die neue Zeit. Wochenschrift der deutschen Sozialdemokratie.1901-1902, 2. Bd.(1902), Heft 1, p. 26-32; Heft 2, p. 60-64; Heft 3, p. 91-96; Heft 4, S. 125-128; Heft 6, p. 188-192; Heft 7, S. 221-224; Heft 12, p. 381-384; Heft 13, p. 412-416; Heft 15, p. 472-480; Heft 17, p. 541-544; Heft 19, p. 604-608; und Heft 25, p. 797-800
 Karl Marx: Briefe an Kugelmann (aus den Jahren von 1862 bis 1874) mit einer Einleitung von N. Lenin. Vereining. Internat. Verl.-Anst., Berlin 1927 (Elementarbücher des Kommunismus 4)
 Karl Marx: Briefe an Kugelmann (aus den Jahren von 1862 bis 1874) mit einer Einleitung von N. Lenin. Dietz Verlag, Berlin 1948 ff.
 Georg Mende: Die Briefe von Karl Marx an der Arzt Dr. Ludwig Kugelmann. In: Wissenschaftliche Zeitschrift der Friedrich-Schiller-Universität Jena. 4. Jg., 1954/1955, Mathematisch-naturwissenschaftliche Reihe. Heft 1
 Bert Andréas: Briefe und Dokumente der Familie Marx aus den Jahren 1862–1873 nebst zwei unbekannten Aufsätzen von Friedrich Engels. In: Archiv für Sozialgeschichte. 2. Bd. Verlag für Literatur und Zeitgeschehen GmbH, Hannover 1962 (letters to the family Kugelmann.)
 Franziska Kugelmann: Small Traits of Marx's Family Life. In: Marx and Engels through the eyes of their contemporaries. Progress Publishers, Moscow 1972, p. 180-192
 Martin Hundt: Louis Kugelmann. Zum 65. Todestag des Korrespondenzpartners von Karl Marx. In: Beiträge zur Geschichte der Arbeiterbewegung. Berlin 1967, Heft 2, p. 294-300
 Martin Hundt: Der Beitrag Louis Kugelmanns zur Propagierung des "Kapitals" in Deutschland 1867 bis 1869. In: Beiträge zur Marx-Engels-Forschung. Berlin 1968, p. 86-90
 Martin Hundt: Gynäkolog und Propagandist des "Kapital". Louis Kugelmann - der berühmte Briefpartner von Marx, ein bedeutender Arzt. In: humanitas (Berlin). Nr. 12 vom 6. Juni 1968
 Martin Hundt: Louis Kugelmann. In: Männer der Revolution. Berlin 1970, p. 101-121
 Martin Hundt: Kugelmann - Freund von Marx und Bücherfreund. In: Marginalien. 37. Heft, Berlin 1970, p. 1-7
 Tagebuch der Pariser Kommune. Karl Marx Friedrich Engels. Zusammengestellt und eingeleitet von Erich Kundel, Hans-Dieter Kruse, Ruth Stolz, Evelin Barth. Dietz Verlag 1971 (letter of Louis Kugelmann.)
 Rolf Dlubek / Hannes Skambraks: „Das Kapital“ von Karl Marx in der deutschen Arbeiterbewegung (1867 bis 1878). Abriß und Zeugnisse der Wirkungsgeschichte. Dietz Verlag 1967 (letters of Louis and Gertrud Kugelmann.)
 Martin Hundt: Louis Kugelmann. Eine Biographie des Arztes und Freundes von Karl Marx und Friedrich Engels, Dietz, Berlin, 1974
 Egon Erwin Kisch: Karl Marx in Karlsbad. Aufbau-Verlag, Berlin / Weimar 1983 (about the Kugelmann family and Marx and Eleanor Marx in Carlsbad.)
 Boris Rudjak: Ein Irrtum ist zu korrigerien. Über fünf Photographien, die Portraits der Frau und der ältesten Tochter von Karl Marx bekannt wurden. In: Marx-Engels-Jahrbuch 13, Berlin 1990, p. 320-328 (Those pictures of Gertrud and Franziska Kugelmann are not those of Jenny von Westphalen and her daughter Jenny.)
 Beiträge zur Marx-Engels-Forschung Neue Folge. Sonderband 2. Erfolgreiche Kooperation: Das Frankfurter Institut für Sozialforschung und das Moskauer Marx-Engels-Institut (1924–1928). Korrespondenz von Felix Weil, Carl Grünberg u.a. mit David Borisovič Rjazanov, Ernst Czóbel u.a. aus dem Russischen Staatlichen Archiv für Sozial- und Politikgeschichte Moskau. Argument, Hamburg 2000, p. 160, 161, 246 (About 15 photographs of Engels and the family of Marx were bought by the Moscow Institute.)
 Peter Schulze: [Artikel Kugelmann] - in: Hannoversches biographisches Lexikon. Von den Anfängen bis in die Gegenwart, Schlüter, Hannover, 2002,  p. 217
 Harald Storz: Louis Kugelmann. Arzt aus Lemförde. - in: Fundstücke. Nachrichten und Beiträge zur Geschichte der Juden in Niedersachsen und Bremen, s.n., Hannover, Heft 3 (2004) p. 8-9
 Norbert Weinitschke: Kugelmann. Wermuth und Fabrikkassen in Hannover. - in: Hannoversche Geschichtsblätter N.F. Bd. 37 (1983), p. 85-97

External links
 Jüdische Schriftstellerinnen und Schriftsteller in Westfalen | Autorendatenbank at www.juedischeliteraturwestfalen.de (Image)

1828 births
1902 deaths
German gynaecologists
German Marxists
Members of the International Workingmen's Association
People from the Kingdom of Hanover